Doris Raab (19 October 1851 – 1933) was a German etcher and engraver.

Biography

Raab was born on 19 October 1851 in Nuremberg. She was the daughter of the artist Johann Leonhard Raab who was also her teacher.

Doris Raab exhibited her work at the Palace of Fine Arts at the 1893 World's Columbian Exposition in Chicago, Illinois. She also exhibited her work at the 1900 Exposition Universelle in Paris.

Her engraving of Mary Queen of Scots receiving the news that her death warrant has been signed by her cousin Queen Elizabeth was published in December 1878 in The Art Journal. It was based on a painting by the Bavarian Karl von Piloty and the magazine was distributed in the UK and the USA.

Raab died in 1933.

References

External links
 

1851 births
1933 deaths
19th-century German women artists
20th-century German women artists
19th-century German artists
20th-century German artists
Artists from Nuremberg